We Three Debutantes is a 1953 Swedish  drama film directed by Hasse Ekman and starring Maj-Britt Nilsson, Sven-Eric Gamble and Per Oscarsson. It was shot at the Råsunda Studios in Stockholm and on location in the city. The film's sets were designed by the art director Nils Svenwall.

Cast
Maj-Britt Nilsson as Lo Stjärnholm
Sven-Eric Gamble as Ludvig Lans
Per Oscarsson as Lillebror Brummer
Karl Gerhard as Karl Gerhard
Olof Winnerstrand as Publisher 
Gunnel Broström as Secretary 
Gunnar Björnstrand as Director Brummer
Åke Grönberg as Swedish John 
Claes Thelander as Young Publisher 
Douglas Håge as Frisk

References

External links

1953 films
Films directed by Hasse Ekman
1950s Swedish-language films
Swedish drama films
1953 drama films
Swedish black-and-white films
1950s Swedish films